Gonzalo Rubalcaba (born May 27, 1963) is an Afro-Cuban jazz pianist and composer.

Early life
Rubalcaba was born Gonzalo Julio González Fonseca in Havana, Cuba into a musical family. He adopted his great grandmother's name for professional use, just as did his father Guillermo Rubalcaba (born Guillermo González Camejo) and his grandfather Jacobo Rubalcaba (born Jacobo González Rubalcaba).

Later life and career
With Orquesta Aragón, Rubalcaba toured France and Africa in 1983. He formed his own Grupo Projecto in 1985.

Discography

As leader/co-leader 
 Mi Gran Pasion (Connector/Timba, 1987)
 Live in Havana (Pimienta, 1989)
 Giraldilla (Pimienta, 1990)
 Discovery: Live at Montreux (Blue Note, 1990)
 Gonzalo Rubalcaba Trio at Montreux (Somethin' Else, 1990)
 The Blessing (Blue Note, 1991)
 Images (Blue Note, 1992)
 At Montreux (Artex, 1993)
 Suite 4 Y 20 (Blue Note, 1993)
 Diz (Blue Note, 1993)
 Rapsodia (Blue Note, 1994)
 Imagine: Live in America (Blue Note, 1994)
 Concatenacion (Egrem, 1995)
 Concierto Negro (Egrem, 1995)
 Flying Colors (Blue Note, 1997)
 Romantic (EMI, 1998)
 Gonzalo Rubalcaba (Max, 1998)
 Antiguo (Blue Note, 1998)
 Inner Voyage (Blue Note/EMI, 1999)
 Inicio (Egrem, 2001)
 Supernova  (Blue Note, 2001)
 Straight Ahead (Yemaya, 2003)
 Soneros de Verdad Present Rubalcaba Pasado y Presente (Universal Music Latino/Pimienta, 2003)
 Paseo (Blue Note, 2004)
 The Trio (Angel, 2005)
 Solo  (Blue Note, 2005)
 Avatar (Angel, 2008)
 Faith (5Passion, 2010)
 XXI Century (5Passion, 2011)
 Live Faith (5Passion, 2014)
 Suite Caminos (5Passion, 2015)
 Tokyo Adagio with Charlie Haden (Impulse!, 2015) – recorded in 2005
 Charlie (5Passion, 2015)
  with Ron Carter, Jack DeJohnette (5Passion, 2021)
 Pédron Rubalcaba with Pierrick Pédron (mars 2023)

As sideman 
With Ignacio Berroa
 Codes (Blue Note, 2006)

With Ron Carter
 Mr. Bow-tie (Somethin' Else, 1995)

With Juan Luis Guerra
Bachata Rosa (Karen, 1990)

With Francisco Céspedes
 Con el Permiso de Bola (Warner Music Mexico, 2006)

With Chick Corea
 Rendezvous in New York (Stretch, 2003)

With Dave Holland
 The Monterey Quartet: Live at the 2007 Monterey Jazz Festival (Monterey Jazz Festival, 2009)

With Al Di Meola
 Pursuit of Radical Rhapsody (Concord, 2011)
 Flesh on Flesh (Telarc, 2022)

With Richard Galliano
 Love Day (Milan, 2008)

With Charlie Haden
 1989: The Montreal Tapes: with Gonzalo Rubalcaba and Paul Motian (Verve, 1997)
 2000: Nocturne (Verve, 2001)
 2003: Land of the Sun (Verve, 2004)
 2005: Tokyo Adagio (Impulse!, 2015) – live at The Blue Note, Tokyo, Japan

With Katia Labèque
 Shape of My Heart (KML, 2009)

With Tony Martinez
 Habana Vive
 Mafarefun

With Pat Martino
 Think Tank

'With Strat Andriotis 
 Night Manager (2018) Song 21Awards

Grammy Awards

|-
| 1995
|Rapsodia| Best Jazz Instrumental Performance, Individual or Group
| 
|-
| 1997
| "Agua de Beber"
| Best Jazz Instrumental Solo 
| 
|-
| scope="row"| 2000
|scope="row"| Antiguo|scope="row"| Best Latin Jazz Album
| 
|-
| scope="row"| 2002
|scope="row"| Supernova|scope="row"| Best Latin Jazz Album
| 
|-
| scope="row"| 2002
|scope="row"| Nocturne (as producer)
|scope="row"| Best Latin Jazz Album
| 
|-
| scope="row"| 2002
|scope="row"| "Oren"
|scope="row"| Best Instrumental Composition
| 
|-
| scope="row"| 2005
|scope="row"| Land of the Sun (as producer)
|scope="row"| Best Latin Jazz Album
| 
|-
| 2016
| Suite Caminos| Best Latin Jazz Album
| 
|-
| 2021
| Viento y Tiempo - Live at Blue Note Tokyo| Best Latin Jazz Album
| 
|-
| 2022
| Skyline| Best Jazz Instrumental Album
|

Billboard Music Awards

|-
| scope="row"| 2002
|scope="row"| Supernova|scope="row"| Latin Jazz Album of the Year
| 
|-
| scope="row"| 2007
|scope="row"| Solo|scope="row"| Latin Jazz Album of the Year
| 
|-

Latin Grammy Awards

|-
| scope="row"| 2002
|scope="row"| Supernova|scope="row"| Best Latin Jazz Album
| 
|-
| scope="row"| 2005
|scope="row"| Paseo|scope="row"| Best Instrumental Album
| 
|-
| scope="row"| 2006
|scope="row"| Solo|scope="row"| Best Latin Jazz Album
| 
|-
| scope="row"| 2008
|scope="row"| Avatar''
|scope="row"| Best Instrumental Album
| 
|-

References

External links
Official website

Afro-Cuban jazz pianists
Post-bop pianists
Latin jazz pianists
Cuban jazz pianists
1963 births
Living people
People from Havana
Grammy Award winners
21st-century pianists